Point of Violence is a 1966 thriller novel by Lois Duncan. It is one of Duncan's few novels written primarily for adults. It follows a young widow who finds herself being stalked while hiding at a remote beach house after the murder of her husband.

Plot
Julia Culler, a recent widow after her husband, Mark, died in a water skiing accident, relocates with her two children to a house on Heron Key, suspicious of a man whom she believes is responsible for her husband's death. At her remote beach home, she finds herself being stalked by an unseen assailant.

References

External links
Point of Violence at Fantastic Fiction

1966 American novels
American thriller novels
Novels by Lois Duncan
Novels set in Florida
Realist novels
Doubleday (publisher) books